The Ypotryll is a Medieval European chimeric creature featured in heraldry. It has the tusked head of a wild boar or hog, the humped body of a camel, the legs and hooves of an ox or goat and the long, scaly tail of a serpent. Its name is thought to be derived from the Greek “hippo” (horse) or in Middle English, “ypotame” itself derived from the Latin "ypotamus". Though there isn't much known of the creature's meanings or origins, it appears as the badge of John Tiptoft, 1st Earl of Worcester, also known as the “Butcher of England”; a man known for his extreme cruelty in regards to the execution of Lancastrians during his rule as Lord High Constable in the early 1460s. The creature is known for its awesome ugliness, and is perhaps a reflection of those that wore it as their mark. Tiptoft was beheaded in 1470 by the Lancastrians during the War of the Roses (1455-1487).

References

Further reading

Medieval European legendary creatures
Heraldic beasts
Mythological hybrids